Michael Wayne Annett (born June 23, 1986) is an  American retired professional stock car racing driver. He last competed in the NASCAR Xfinity Series, driving the No. 1 Chevrolet Camaro for JR Motorsports.

Racing career

Early career
Save for a few mini-cup races during elementary school, Annett started racing after high school, starting at Hawkeye Downs in Iowa. He then advanced to the American Speed Association series. Annett has two career victories in the ARCA Racing Series. His first win came in the ARCA RE/MAX 250 at Talladega Superspeedway on October 5, 2007, and his second win came in the Daytona ARCA 200 at Daytona International Speedway on February 9, 2008.

NASCAR

Camping World Truck Series
Along with a part-time ARCA schedule, Annett competed in a handful of NASCAR Camping World Truck Series events in 2008. He made his debut on June 20 at The Milwaukee Mile, and scored a best finish of 2nd at Kentucky Speedway.

Annett returned to the series on two occasions in 2014 and 2021, both at dirt tracks: the former came with NTS Motorsports at Eldora Speedway, while the latter was at Knoxville Raceway for Young's Motorsports. However, he was replaced by Chris Windom at the latter after practice due to a leg injury.

Xfinity Series

Towards the end of 2008, Annett signed with Germain Racing to drive for the team in NASCAR's Nationwide Series. Annett made his debut in the final race of the 2008 season at the Homestead-Miami Speedway, where he crashed out and finished 36th.

For 2009, Annett ran for Rookie of the Year honors in the No. 15 Toyota Camry, with sponsorships from Pilot Travel Centers and HYPE Energy. He scored four top-tens en route to a 10th-place finish in points, but finished second to Justin Allgaier. Annett returned to Germain in 2010, but found less success than in 2009. He accumulated just two Top 10’s (at Nashville and Iowa) and only led seven laps, finishing 13th in the overall points standings.

Annett left Germain for Rusty Wallace Racing in 2011, driving the team's No. 62 Toyota Camry with Pilot Travel Centers (now Pilot Flying J) sponsoring. He achieved seven Top 10 finishes, placing him ninth overall in the final points standings. After the shutdown of RWR, Annett moved to Richard Petty Motorsports in 2012 NASCAR Nationwide Series season. He earned six Top 5’s and 17 Top 10’s, finishing fifth in points.

The following season, Annett missed eight races due in a hard crash he suffered in the season-opening DRIVE4COPD 300 at Daytona International Speedway, suffering what was initially reported as a bruised sternum. Further evaluation showed that Annett had dislocated and fractured his sternum, requiring surgery; Aric Almirola replaced Annett in the No. 43 for the Dollar General 200 at Phoenix International Raceway, with Reed Sorenson subbing after that. Annett backs in Charlotte in May, and recorded one Top 5 and four Top 10s, finishing 15th in the points standings.

On November 4, 2016, Annett announced he would be returning to the Nationwide Series – now known as the Xfinity Series – in 2017, driving the No. 5 Chevrolet Camaro for JR Motorsports on a full-time basis.

In his first full-time season with JRM, Annett scored one Top 5 and seven Top 10’s.  His best finish was second at Road America.  He finished the season ninth in points.  Then in 2018, Annett had a dismal season, scoring only three Top 10 finishes with the best result being a seventh-place scoring at Bristol. This led to a 14th-place finish in points. On January 25, 2019, it was announced that Annett would be driving the No. 1 Chevrolet with the points from the No. 5 car going over to the No. 1 car.

On February 16, 2019, Annett scored his first career victory at Daytona International Speedway in the NASCAR Racing Experience 300. After a beginning to 2019 that was markedly better than 2018, Annett credited crew chief Travis Mack, who joined the team in late summer-2018, as a catalyst for the success.

Annett returned to JRM in 2020 and qualified for the playoffs. He was eliminated after the first round.

In July 2021, Annett missed the races at Atlanta and New Hampshire due to a stress fracture in his right femur. Austin Dillon served as his replacement in the No. 1 for Atlanta, while Josh Berry did so for New Hampshire. On October, 6 of that year Annett announced he would retire from  full-time competition at the end of the 2021 season.

Sprint Cup Series

In November 2013, it was announced that Annett would be moving up to the NASCAR Sprint Cup Series for the 2014 season, driving for Tommy Baldwin Racing in the No. 7 Chevrolet. It was a rough rookie season however and he had only four top 20 finishes en route to a 33rd-place points finish that year. Annett was replaced after the season by Alex Bowman.

Annett announced on January 27 that he was switching teams and would be driving for HScott Motorsports, thus bringing HScott  to a two-car team. He began the year by racing his way into the Daytona 500, finishing a career-best 13th. Annett failed to qualify the race at Atlanta thanks to controversy during qualifying, but Richard Childress Racing development driver Brian Scott gave Annett his spot in the race because Scott was running for Xfinity Series points while Annett was running for Cup Series points. The No. 33 was the same RCR car that Scott was supposed to drive, but used all HScott Motorsports personnel and ran under the Hillman-Circle Sport LLC banner.

Annett later failed to qualify again at Talladega in October. This time no one gave up their seat for Annett and he did not race. At the end of the 2015 season, Annett's average finish was worse with HScott Motorsports than it was with Baldwin despite running in a stabled team.

Annett returned to the team in 2016, joined by new teammate Clint Bowyer. Prior to the Bass Pro Shops NRA Night Race, Annett was replaced by former teammate Justin Allgaier in the No. 46 as he had been suffering from flu-like symptoms. On November 1, Annett announced that he would not return to HScott Motorsports in 2017.

Personal life
Annett was born in Des Moines, Iowa. His late father Harrold was the CEO of TMC Transportation, which has sponsored Michael's racing efforts. Annett played as defenseman for the Waterloo Black Hawks of the United States Hockey League prior to starting his racing career.  In 2004, he was a member of the team that won Clark Cup, and he was named "Most Improved Player" on a team that included future hockey player Joe Pavelski. His father used to own a dirt track team which fielded drivers including Sammy Swindell, before selling up prior to him starting his hockey career. At 5'10", and 180 lbs, he was considered too small to play at a higher level.

Legal issues
On February 6, 2011, Annett had rear-ended a car Sunday morning in Mooresville, North Carolina that was stopped at a red light. According to police reports Annett was seen eating mints when examined and had a registered BAC of 0.32, four times the legal limit in North Carolina. Annett subsequently resisted arrest as he did not want to be handcuffed. He also claimed that he had been texting, and thus could not stop in time to avoid an accident; a similar incident involving Annett had occurred in 2010. RWR said that they did not condone the incident and that Annett would be facing internal sanctions. NASCAR had also kept in contact with the local authorities as well as Rusty Wallace Racing. Annett issued a formal apology, and did not miss any races.

Motorsports career results

NASCAR
(key) (Bold – Pole position awarded by qualifying time. Italics – Pole position earned by points standings or practice time. * – Most laps led.)

NASCAR Cup Series

Daytona 500

Xfinity Series

Camping World Truck Series

K&N Pro Series West

 Season still in progress
 Ineligible for series points

ARCA Re/Max Series
(key) (Bold – Pole position awarded by qualifying time. Italics – Pole position earned by points standings or practice time. * – Most laps led.)

See also
List of NASCAR drivers
List of people from Des Moines, Iowa

References

External links

 
 
 TMC Transportation

Living people
1986 births
Sportspeople from Des Moines, Iowa
Racing drivers from Iowa
Racing drivers from Des Moines, Iowa
NASCAR drivers
ARCA Menards Series drivers
American men's ice hockey defensemen
USAC Silver Crown Series drivers
JR Motorsports drivers